Anania federalis is a moth in the family Crambidae. It was described by Hahn William Capps in 1967. It is found in Mexico.

References

Moths described in 1967
Pyraustinae
Moths of Central America